The title Marquess of Dorset has been created three times in the Peerage of England. It was first created in 1397 for John Beaufort, 1st Earl of Somerset, but he lost the title two years later. It was then created in 1442 for Edmund Beaufort, 1st Earl of Dorset, who was created Duke of Somerset in 1448. That creation was attainted in 1463.

It was created a third time in 1475 for Thomas Grey, 1st Earl of Huntingdon, who then resigned the earldom. The Marquess held the subsidiary title of Baron Ferrers of Groby (1299). The third marquess was created Duke of Suffolk in 1551, but he was attainted in 1554 and all the peerages were forfeited.

Marquesses of Dorset, first Creation (1397)
Other titles: Marquess of Somerset (1397) and Earl of Somerset (1397)
John Beaufort, 1st Marquess of Dorset (died 1410), eldest legitimated child of John of Gaunt, 1st Duke of Lancaster, himself third surviving son of Edward III was degraded in 1399 by Henry IV Bolingbroke for his role as a counter-appellant for Richard II

Marquesses of Dorset, second Creation (1442)
see Duke of Somerset, second Creation

Marquesses of Dorset, third Creation (1475)
Other titles: Baron Ferrers of Groby (1299)
Thomas Grey, 1st Marquess of Dorset (1451–1501) was stepson to Edward IV
Thomas Grey, 2nd Marquess of Dorset (1477–1530), a son of the 1st Marquess
Henry Grey, 3rd Marquess of Dorset, 1st Duke of Suffolk (1517–1554), eldest son of the 2nd Marquess, was created Duke of Suffolk in 1551. He was found guilty of treason, attainted and all of his honours forfeit in 1554.

References
  See pp. 431–432.

Forfeited marquessates in the Peerage of England
Noble titles created in 1397
Noble titles created in 1442
Noble titles created in 1475
Marquesses of Dorset